3074 Popov, provisional designation , is a carbonaceous Nysian asteroid from the inner regions of the asteroid belt, approximately  in diameter. It was discovered on 24 December 1979, by Soviet–Russian astronomer Lyudmila Zhuravleva at the Crimean Astrophysical Observatory in Nauchnyj on the Crimean peninsula. The B-type asteroid has an unknown rotation period. It was named after Russian physicist Alexander Stepanovich Popov, an early radio pioneer in Russia.

Orbit and classification 

Popov is a member of the carbonaceous subgroup of the Nysa family, a group of asteroids in the inner main-belt not far from the Kirkwood gap at 2.5 AU, a depleted zone where a 3:1 orbital resonance with the orbit of Jupiter exists. The Nysian group is named after its largest member 44 Nysa.

It orbits the Sun in the inner asteroid belt at a distance of 2.1–2.6 AU once every 3 years and 7 months (1,307 days; semi-major axis of 2.34 AU). Its orbit has an eccentricity of 0.11 and an inclination of 2° with respect to the ecliptic.

Physical characteristics 

In the SMASS classification, Popov is a B-type asteroid, which have a "brighter" surface than the common carbonaceous C-types.

Diameter and albedo 

According to the survey carried out by the NEOWISE mission of NASA's Wide-field Infrared Survey Explorer, Popov measures 9.875 kilometers in diameter and its surface has an albedo of 0.070.

Rotation period 

As of 2018, no rotational lightcurve of Popov has been obtained from photometric observations. The body's rotation period, shape and poles remain unknown.

Naming 

This minor planet was named after Russian physicist Alexander Stepanovich Popov (1859–1906), who is considered to be the inventor of radio in his homeland and in eastern European countries. The official naming citation was published by the Minor Planet Center on 31 May 1988. The lunar crater Popov was also named in his honor.

References

External links 
 Asteroid Lightcurve Database (LCDB), query form (info )
 Dictionary of Minor Planet Names, Google books
 Discovery Circumstances: Numbered Minor Planets (1)-(5000) – Minor Planet Center
 
 

003074
Discoveries by Lyudmila Zhuravleva
Named minor planets
003074
19791224